Claughton is a village and suburb of Birkenhead, on the Wirral Peninsula, Merseyside, England. Administratively, Claughton is a ward of the Metropolitan Borough of Wirral. Before local government reorganisation on 1 April 1974, it was part of the County Borough of Birkenhead, within the county of Cheshire.

At the 2001 census, the population of Claughton was 13,723. 
For the 2011 census the total population of Claughton Ward, which also included Noctorum, was 14,705.

History
The name is of Viking origin, deriving from the Old Norse Klakkr-tun, meaning "hamlet on a hillock".

Claughton Manor House was built in about 1850 by local benefactor Sir William Jackson, with its gardens designed by Sir Joseph Paxton. It occupied a site between Egerton Road and Manor Hill until it was pulled down in the 1930s.

Recalling his childhood in Claughton in the 1860s, the artist Harry B. Neilson wrote: 

The Birkenhead Institute was founded in 1889 by a local philanthropist, George Atkin, who established the school as a commercial company with shareholders and directors. 
Originally situated in Whetstone Lane, Birkenhead, it was relocated in the 1970s to premises on Tollemache Road in Claughton. The school closed in 1994  and was subsequently demolished. Wilfred Owen, the World War I poet, attended the school at its original location. A residential road has been named after him on the Tollemache Road site.

Civic history
Previously a township split between the parishes of Bidston and Woodchurch of the Wirral Hundred, Claughton was a civil parish from 1866 until 1898 when it was added to Birkenhead civil parish and municipal borough. The population was recorded at 67 in 1801, 714 in 1851 
and 733 in 1898.
On 1 April 1974, local government reorganisation in England and Wales resulted in most of the Wirral Peninsula, including Claughton, transfer from Cheshire to the nascent county of Merseyside.

Geography

Governance
Claughton is within the parliamentary constituency of Birkenhead. The current Member of Parliament is Mick Whitley, a Labour representative. He has been the MP since 2019.

At local government level, the area is incorporated into the Claughton Ward of the Metropolitan Borough of Wirral, in the metropolitan county of Merseyside. It is represented on Wirral Metropolitan Borough Council by three councillors. The most recent local elections took place on 6 May 2021.

Economy
The village has a large number of shops, as well as cafes, bakery, florist, post office, and local pubs such as the 'Claughton Hotel', the 'Heather Brow' and 'Houlihan's Variety Club'.

Education
Claughton is the location of Birkenhead Sixth Form College, which was established by the local education authority in 1988.

Transport
Claughton Village lies on the A5027 road, which continues on westbound to Saughall Massie and joins the A553 road towards Birkenhead.

This station is on the Wirral Line of the Merseyrail network.

Notable people
The artist Harry B. Neilson grew up in Claughton, living in a house in Forest Road called Airliewood which his father had built in 1863.

War artist Edgar Downs was born in Claughton in 1876, as was Cecil Arthur Lewis, the First World War fighter ace and BBC executive, in 1898.

Others
Charles Alford, church minister, incumbent at Christ Church, Claughton
John Blakeney, priest, curate of Christ Church, Claughton
Gruffydd Evans, Baron Evans of Claughton, politician, educated in Birkenhead and lived in Claughton
Cecil Holden, cricketer, died in Claughton
Stephen Ladyman, Labour politician, educated in Claughton
Charles Reed, architect, died in Claughton
John Taylor, church minister, vicar of Christ Church, Claughton
William Taylor, church minister, curate in Claughton
Harry Verelst, cricketer, born in Claughton
Frederick Smeeton Williams, church minister, worked in Claughton
Arthur Willmer, cricketer, born in Claughton

See also
Listed buildings in Claughton, Merseyside

References

Bibliography

External links

Towns and villages in the Metropolitan Borough of Wirral
Birkenhead